Eparistera Daimones is the debut album by Swiss extreme metal band Triptykon, the most recent musical project of Thomas Gabriel Fischer (a.k.a. Tom G. Warrior), founding member of the pioneering heavy metal bands Hellhammer and Celtic Frost and industrial project Apollyon Sun.

The album was released by Prowling Death Records Ltd., under a licensing agreement with Century Media Records on 22 March 2010, and was released by Victor Entertainment Japan on 21 April 2010 with a bonus track, "Shatter".
Upon its release, Eparistera Daimones was met with universal acclaim by both music critics and band fans.

Eparistera Daimones was produced by Thomas Gabriel Fischer and Triptykon guitarist V. Santura and recorded in V. Santura's own Woodshed Studio in southern Germany, in the course of the second half of 2009. Like Celtic Frost's Monotheist album, Eparistera Daimones was mastered by Walter Schmid at Oakland Recording in Winterthur, Switzerland.

The album features artwork by H. R. Giger and Vincent Castiglia.

The title of album is originally from Aleister Crowley's Liber XXV: The Star Ruby ritual. Eparistera Daimones (ΕΠΑΡΙΣΤΕΡΑ ΔΑΙΜΟΝΕΣ) in Greek means On my left hand the Daemones or To my left, the demons.

"Myopic Empire" comes from "Relinquished Body", a demo track from Celtic Frost's 2002 demo album Prototype.

Track listing 

Japanese edition

Formats 
Eparistera Daimones was released in several formats including CD, digipak CD, and double gatefold LP.

Chart positions

Personnel 
 Thomas Gabriel Fischer – vocals, guitar, keyboards, programming
 V. Santura – guitar, vocals
 Norman Lonhard – drums & percussion
 Vanja Slajh – bass

Collaborations 
 Simone Vollenweider – additional vocals
 A. Acanthus Gristle – additional vocals
 Fredy Schnyder – grand piano
 Nadine Rimlinger – violin

Production 
 Tom Gabriel Warrior and V. Santura – production, recording and mixing
 Walter Schmid – mastering
 Antje Lange and Tom Warrior – executive producers
 Vincent Castiglia – band illustrations
 H. R. Giger – cover art "Vlad Tepes"

References 

2010 debut albums
Triptykon albums
Century Media Records albums
Albums with cover art by H. R. Giger